Armani (or spelled Armoni, Armony, Armonie, and Armonee) is an Italian, English name of Persian or Hebrew origin.

Surname 
 Abgar Ali Akbar Armani, Armenian of the Safavid Empire
 Amir Beg Armani, 17th-century Safavid official
 Andrea Armani, American professor at the Viterbi School of Engineering at USC
 Eduardo Armani, Argentine violinist and conductor
 Franco Armani, Argentine football player
 Giorgio Armani (born 1934) Italian fashion designer
 Khosrow Soltan Armani, 17th-century Safavid official
 Leandro Armani, Argentine football player
 Luciano Armani (1940–2023), Italian cyclist
 Marco Armani, Italian singer-songwriter
 Nora Armani, actor and filmmaker
 Pier Martire Armani, Italian painter of the Baroque period
 Vincenza Armani, Italian actress

Given name 
 Armani Depaul, American rapper and producer
 Armani Little, English footballer
 Armani Mahiruddin, Malaysian politician
 Armani Moore, American basketball player
 Armani Rogers (born 1997), American football player
 Armani Watts, American football player
 Armani Williams, American stock car racing driver
 Lil Baby (born Dominique Armani Jones in 1994), American rapper

See also
 Armani (disambiguation)
 Al-Armani, a surname

Italian-language surnames
Masculine given names